The Constitution of the State of Wisconsin is the governing document of the U.S. State of Wisconsin. It establishes the structure and function of state government, describes the state boundaries, and declares the rights of state citizens. The Wisconsin Constitution was written at a constitutional convention held in Madison, Wisconsin, in December 1847 and approved by the citizens of Wisconsin Territory in a referendum held in March 1848. Wisconsin was admitted to the United States on May 29, 1848. Although it has been amended over a hundred times, the original constitution ratified in 1848 is still in use. This makes the Wisconsin Constitution the oldest U.S. state constitution outside of New England. Only Massachusetts, New Hampshire, Vermont, Maine, and Rhode Island use older constitutions.

The current Wisconsin Constitution contains a brief preamble and fourteen articles detailing the state government, its powers, and its limitations.

Creation of the Wisconsin Constitution
Although Wisconsin continues to use the original constitution ratified as Wisconsin achieved statehood, the current constitution is the second document to be proposed as the state constitution. In 1846, the residents of Wisconsin Territory first voted to apply for statehood, and they elected 124 representatives to meet in Madison to author a state constitution. These delegates, most of them elected as Democrats, met in the fall of 1846 to write the constitution. However, the document they produced by December 1846 contained several provisions which were deemed radical at the time. The document gave married women the right to own property and allowed for a public referendum to settle the issue of African American suffrage. In addition, Edward G. Ryan, the delegate from Racine, Wisconsin, introduced a section to the constitution that prohibited all commercial banking in Wisconsin. Not ready to accept some of these provisions, the public rejected the first proposed constitution in a referendum and elected a second delegation to write a constitution which would be more acceptable to the people.

The second constitutional convention produced a much more conservative document that lacked the controversial progressive clauses in its predecessor. The second draft constitution was mute on the controversial issues of women's property rights. It gave suffrage only to white male citizens over the age of twenty one and American Indians that had been made citizens of the United States, but gave the legislature the ability to extend suffrage to other groups through laws approved by public referendum. Although drafted in English, the drafters contracted with publishers of newspapers in the territory, not printed in the English language, to translate the constitution into the languages in which such newspapers were printed. The issue of banking was put to a public vote; citizens could decide for themselves whether or not the state legislature could pass laws allowing banking after the constitution was ratified. The second proposed constitution was finished in December 1847, and was approved by the public in March 1848. During the same election, voters also chose to allow the legislature to charter banks. Shortly after the referendum, the state constitution was ratified by the United States Senate and put into effect with the election of the first state officials.

Provisions of the current Wisconsin Constitution

Preamble 
The Constitution begins with the following preamble:

Declaration of Rights
The first article of the Wisconsin constitution outlines the legal rights of state citizens. In addition to reaffirming the rights guaranteed in the United States Bill of Rights, Article I of the Wisconsin Constitution offers additional guarantees to its citizens. Among these are sections which prohibit slavery, prohibit imprisonment for debt, guarantee resident aliens the same property rights as citizens, affirm that the military is subordinate to civil authorities, allow for the use of state owned school buildings by civil and religious organizations during non-school hours, and guarantee the right of citizens to hunt and fish.

Legislature
The Wisconsin Legislature is described in Article IV of the Wisconsin Constitution. It is divided into two houses, the Wisconsin State Assembly and Wisconsin State Senate. The constitution sets forth the method of electing legislators and gives their terms as two years for representatives to the assembly and four years for senators. It allows bills to originate in either house, and gives each house the ability to amend bills already passed by the other. In addition, the Wisconsin Constitution outlines certain limitations to the power of the legislative branch of government. The state legislature is prohibited by the constitution from authorizing gambling, although amendments have introduced numerous exceptions to this rule including an allowance for bingo games held by certain non-profit organizations and a state lottery. The legislature is also prohibited from passing legislation affecting certain private business, such as voting to change a person's name.

Executive Branch
Article V of the Wisconsin Constitution describes executive office in the state, providing for a governor and lieutenant governor who are elected jointly to four-year terms. The constitution also outlines the powers and duties of the executive branch. The governor of Wisconsin is given command of the state's military forces and empowered to pardon convicts. The Wisconsin Constitution also allows the governor to veto bills passed by the state legislature. The governor is also given line-item veto power over bills of appropriation, allowing the executive to cut out certain parts of legislation. The constitution does, however, prohibit the governor to create a new word in a bill by objecting to certain letters. Rejected bills or portions of bills are then returned to the legislative house where the bill originated, where a vote from two thirds of the members can override the veto.

Article V also sets forth a line of succession for the governor should he resign, be removed, or die. In the absence of a governor, executive power is transferred to the lieutenant governor, and in cases where both the governor and lieutenant governor are unable to fulfill executive responsibilities, these powers are transferred to the Wisconsin Secretary of State.

Administrative Branch
Article VI of the Wisconsin Constitution describes other administrative positions, providing for a secretary of state, treasurer, and attorney general to be elected to four-year terms on the same schedule as the governor and lieutenant governor.  

Article VI also describes rules for various elected officials on the county level, including sheriffs, coroners, registers of deeds, and district attorneys.

Judicial Branch
The Wisconsin Constitution outlines the state's judicial branch in Article VII, granting judicial power in the state to a unified Wisconsin Supreme Court consisting of seven justices elected to ten-year terms. The chief justice of the court is elected for a term of 2 years by the vote of a majority of the justices then serving on the court, although the justice so elected may decline the appointment. In addition to the supreme court, the constitution provides for the Wisconsin Circuit Courts, which each have districts prescribed by the legislature with borders following county boundaries. An intermediary body between the supreme court and the circuit courts, the Wisconsin Court of Appeals, is also established in the state constitution. Finally, the legislature is granted power to form municipal courts with jurisdiction over individual cities, villages, and towns in the state.

Article VII of the Wisconsin Constitution also describes the process for impeaching and trying state officials. A majority of members in the state assembly can vote to impeach a civil officer. The state senate is then given the power to conduct a trial of the impeached official. If two thirds of the senators present vote to convict the officer, the convicted party is removed from office and made subject to further prosecution under law.

Education
Article X of the Wisconsin Constitution describes the establishment of school districts and a state university, as well as rules, standards, and funding mechanisms for state education.  It also establishes the office of superintendent of public instruction, and specifically forbids "sectarian" instruction in public schools.

Amending the Constitution
The process for making changes to the Wisconsin Constitution is stated in Article XII.

Wisconsin does not have petition-based referendums or initiatives; an amendment (including a full replacement of the state's constitution) can be made either via constitutional convention or introduced by either house of the state legislature.

In order to call a constitutional convention, a majority of the state legislators must vote in favor of holding a new convention, and then the people of Wisconsin must approve the vote to call a convention at the next general election.

If an amendment is introduced via the legislature, its passing requires a lengthy three-vote process:
 First, a majority of members in both houses of the state legislature must vote in favor of the amendment.
 Once the proposed amendment passes both houses for the first time, any further progress in the amendment's adaptation must wait until after general elections have been held and the state legislature has reconvened with the members chosen in the new elections; then, both houses must vote a second time to accept the proposed amendment (without changes).
 Should the amendment pass the legislature twice, it must be approved in a third vote by the voters at the next general election.

Notable amendments

 November 1870: All but eliminated the grand jury system in Wisconsin. (Art. I, Sec. 8) 
 November 1881: Converted Wisconsin Legislature from annual to biennial, and expanded terms in office for state legislators to match the longer legislative terms. (Art. IV, Secs. 4, 5, 11)
 April 1889: Changed the position of Chief Justice of the Wisconsin Supreme Court to be the senior-most member of the court, it had previously been a statewide elected office. (Art. VII, Sec. 4)
 November 1926: Enabled recall elections for elected officials to be triggered by petition. (Art. XIII, Sec. 12)
 November 1934: Women's suffrage. (Art. III, Sec. 1)
 April 1953: To change the constitutional guidance on redistricting to put more emphasis on equalizing the geographic size of districts.  This amendment was ratified by referendum, but quickly declared invalid by the Wisconsin Supreme Court.  (Art. IV, Secs. 3, 4, 5)
 April 1967: Converted the Governor and Lieutenant Governor from 2-year terms to 4-year terms.  A separate simultaneous amendment combined the two into a single ticket election, rather than having them as separately elected officers. (Art. V, Secs. 1m, 1n) (Art. V, Sec. 3)
 April 1977: Overhaul of state court system, combining the Wisconsin circuit courts with the county courts.  A simultaneous amendment creating the Wisconsin Court of Appeals.  Another simultaneous amendment established that the Legislature was enabled to set a mandatory retirement age for judges. (Art. VII, Sec. 2) (Art. VII, Sec. 5) (Art. VII, Sec. 24)
 April 2015: Changed the position of Chief Justice of the Wisconsin Supreme Court to a two-year term to be chosen by a majority vote of the members of the court. (Art. VII, Sec. 4)

Original document
The original copy of the 1848 document is missing. This handwritten copy contained the signatures of all the delegates who drafted it during the second constitutional convention of 1847. As arguably one of the more important artifacts related to the history of the state, the mystery of its whereabouts has become a well known anecdote in the state.

Soon after it was drafted, the original document was submitted to a printer named Horace A. Tenney of Madison, who produced three certified copies. Two of these copies and the original are missing. The one remaining copy contains the names of the original signers, but not the actual signatures. This is the copy that is used for a display in the rotunda of the State Capitol Building.

The first to discover the original document was missing was historian Lyman Draper, who tried unsuccessfully to locate it in 1882. The topic was first reported by the Milwaukee Sentinel in 1917, and subsequently reported by many other news outlets over the years, including Madison's Capital Times in 1935.

There have been different theories about the document's existence and whereabouts. Two common theories include the notion that the original was never returned by the printer, and also a theory that it was taken as a souvenir by one of the delegates from the constitutional convention.

The first mass printing occurred when printer Beriah Brown issued it in pamphlet form, of which a color facsimile is available for viewing on the website of the state's Historical Society. Although the Beriah Brown printing was laced with many printers' errors and important textual inaccuracies, it was what state residents of the time read when they voted to endorse a Wisconsin constitution in 1848.

Delegates and signatories for the 1st constitutional convention (1846)
 President of the Convention: Don A. J. Upham of Milwaukee County
 Secretary of the Convention: La Fayette Kellogg of Dane County

Delegates and signatories for the 2nd constitutional convention (1847–1848)
 President of the Convention: Morgan Lewis Martin of Brown County
 Secretary of the Convention: Thomas McHugh of Walworth County

References

External links
 Text of the Wisconsin Constitution (PDF)
 The Making of the Wisconsin Constitution (Article from the State Bar of Wisconsin)
 Turning Points of Wisconsin History: The State Constitutions of 1846 and 1848
 Constitutional Minutes episode about the Wisconsin constitution from the American Archive of Public Broadcasting

Wisconsin
Constitution